Siphosihle Emmanuel Hlomuka is a South African politician who is the Member of the Executive Council (MEC) for Transport, Community Safety and Liaison in KwaZulu-Natal, having been appointed in August 2022. He served as the MEC for Co-operative Governance and Traditional Affairs from May 2019 to August 2022. Hlomuka was sworn in as a Member of the Provincial Legislature in May 2019. He is the current deputy provincial secretary of the African National Congress.

Early life and education
Hlomuka was born in Ladysmith, Natal Province. He studied at the University of KwaZulu-Natal where he obtained a bachelor's degree in public administration and an honours degree in public administration.

Political career
Hlomuka is a member of the African National Congress. He is the party's current deputy provincial secretary. He also served in the African National Congress Youth League.

Following the provincial election that was held on 8 May 2019, he was nominated to the KwaZulu-Natal Legislature. He was sworn in as a member on 22 May 2019. On 27 May 2019, premier Sihle Zikalala appointed him to the post of Member of the Executive Council (MEC) for Co-operative Governance and Traditional Affairs, succeeding Nomusa Dube-Ncube. He was sworn in the same day.

On 10 May 2022, Cabinet approved Hlomuka's appointment as the  Deputy Director-General of Local Government Support and Interventions Management at the national Cooperative Governance and Traditional Affairs ministry. He will soon vacate his position in the provincial government.

Ahead of the ANC provincial elective conference from 22–24 July 2022, the ANC in eThekwini announced its support for Hlomuka's bid for a second term as deputy provincial secretary. Hlomuka was re-elected at the conference.

On 11 August 2022, Hlomuka was appointed by the newly elected premier Nomusa Dube-Ncube as the MEC for  Transport, Community Safety and Liaison.

Personal life
In November 2019, Hlomuka's brother, Nathi, and his friend were shot dead in a drive-by shooting in Peacetown outside Ladysmith.

References

External links
KwaZulu-Natal Cooperative Governance and Traditional Affairs MEC Sipho Hlomuka – Profile
Hon. SE Hlomuka

Living people
Year of birth missing (living people)
Zulu people
People from KwaZulu-Natal
African National Congress politicians
Members of the KwaZulu-Natal Legislature